Dianne Langston Hart (born June 26, 1955) is a Democratic member of the Florida Legislature representing the State's 61st House district.

Career
Hart was elected unopposed on November 6, 2018, from the platform of Democratic Party.

References

Hart, Dianne
Living people
21st-century American politicians
21st-century American women politicians
Women state legislators in Florida
1955 births